Eternal Call was a Soviet 1973–1983 epic TV series directed by Vladimir Krasnopolsky and Valery Uskov by the eponymous novel of Anatoli Ivanov shot by Mosfilm.

Plot
The series traces the fates of a Siberian family of Savelyevs since 1906 into 1960s, including three wars, Russian Revolution, establishment of the Soviet power, epoch of Stalinism, etc.

Cast
Savelievs
 Pyotr Lyubeshkin as Silanty Savelyev, head of the family
 Vladimir Borisov as Semyon
 Tamara Degtyaryova as Agatha
 Vladimir Zemlyanikin as Grigory
 Nikolai Ivanov as Ivan
 Nikolai Lebedev as Mitrofan
 Ada Rogovtseva as Anna (nee Kaftanova)
 Aleksei Serebryakov as Dima
 Vadim Spiridonov as Fyodor
 Valeri Khlevinsky as Anton
Others
 Tamara Syomina as Anfisa
 Oleg Basilashvili as Arnold Mikhailovich Lakhnovsky, officer of the tsarist secret police, later an officer of the Abwehr
 Pyotr Velyaminov as Polycarp Kruzhilin
 Zinaida Vorkul as Markovna
 Vladimir Zamansky as Fyodor Nechayev
 Boris Ivanov as whiteguard general
 Mikhail Kokshenov as Arkady Molchun
 Yefim Kopelyan as Mikhail Lukich Kaftanov
 Vera Kuznetsova as Glafira Dementyevna
 Natalya Kustinskaya as Polina
 Ivan Lapikov as Pankrat Nazarov
 Rimma Markova as Vasilisa
 Andrey Martynov as Kiryan Inyutin
 Radner Muratov as Magomedov
 Olga Naumenko as Varya 
 Leonid Kharitonov as Yegor

Awards
The series was awarded the USSR State Prize in the field of literature, art, and architecture.

References

External links
  Encyclopedia of Russian cinema

Soviet television miniseries
1970s Soviet television series
1980s Soviet television series

Recipients of the USSR State Prize
Family saga television series
Mosfilm films
Russian-language television shows
Television series set in the 1900s
Television series set in the 1910s
Television series set in the 1920s
Television series set in the 1930s
Television series set in the 1940s
Television series set in the 1950s
Television series set in the 1960s
Russian Revolution films
Soviet epic films
Historical television series
Films based on Russian novels
Films set in Siberia